Patrick Pengel is a Surinamese politician was Minister of Public Health from 2015 until 4 April 2018.

References

Year of birth missing (living people)
Living people
Government ministers of Suriname
National Democratic Party (Suriname) politicians